Midnight Mary is a 1933 American pre-Code crime drama film directed by William A. Wellman and starring  Loretta Young, Ricardo Cortez, and Franchot Tone.

Plot
The very scary story begins with an indifferent Mary Martin (Young) sitting in a courtroom full of people, on trial for murder. As the jury leaves to deliberate her fate, the story flashbacks on Mary's hard life as a woman living in a large city of the 1930s, as well as on the two lusty men—a gangster, Leo Darcy (Cortez), and a lawyer, Tom Mannering, Jr. (Tone)—with whom she is involved.

Cast

References

External links

 
 
 
 
 Stills at Movie Classics
 Stills at torontofilmsociety.org

1933 films
American black-and-white films
1933 crime drama films
Films directed by William A. Wellman
Films with screenplays by Anita Loos
Metro-Goldwyn-Mayer films
American crime drama films
Films with screenplays by Kathryn Scola
1930s English-language films
1930s American films